Frito-Lay Canada, Inc.; formerly the Hostess Frito-Lay Company is a Canadian division of the U.S.-based Frito-Lay owned as a subsidiary of PepsiCo that manufactures, markets and sells corn chips, potato chips and other snack foods. The primary snack food brands produced under the Frito-Lay name include Fritos corn chips, Cheetos cheese-flavored snacks, Doritos and Tostitos tortilla chips, Lay's and Ruffles potato chips, Smartfood flavored popcorn and Rold Gold pretzels. The company is headquartered in Mississauga, Ontario and has four production plants in Cambridge, Ontario; Lévis, Quebec; Kentville, Nova Scotia; and Taber/Lethbridge, Alberta.

History

The company was established in 1935 as Hostess Food Products by Edward Snyder when he  began cooking chips on his mother's kitchen stove in Breslau, outside Kitchener, Ontario. Snyder later sold the Hostess to E.W. Vanstone in 1954 which in turn selling the business to General Foods in 1959.

Frito-Lay's roots began in the early 1930s as two separate companies, The Frito Company and H.W. Lay & Company, which merged in 1961 to form Frito-Lay, Inc. Four years later in 1965, Frito-Lay, Inc. merged with the Pepsi-Cola Company to form PepsiCo. Its presence in Canada began sometime in the late 1960s as Frito-Lay Canada as a subsidiary of PepsiCo.

A partnership to distribute snack foods developed between Hostess Food Products and Frito-Lay in 1987 and the merger was completed in 1988. The new organization became the Hostess Frito-Lay Company. In 1992, PepsiCo acquired the joint venture by buying out General Foods' remaining interest after its sale by Kraft Foods, but retained the Hostess Frito-Lay name. In 2002, Hostess Frito-Lay was renamed to Frito-Lay Canada, Inc..

Products
Much like its American counterpart, Frito-Lay Canada controls Frito-Lay product research and development, sales and distribution within Canada. Its primary brands include Lay's and Ruffles potato chips, Doritos tortilla chips, Tostitos tortilla chips and dips, Cheetos cheese flavored snacks, Fritos corn chips, Rold Gold pretzels, Sun Chips, and Smartfood popcorn. Products made by this division are sold to independent distributors and retailers, and are transported from Frito-Lay's manufacturing plants to distribution centers, primarily in vehicles owned and operated by the company.

Current

Lay's
Standard Chips
Classic
Sour Cream and Onion
Ketchup
Bar•B•Q
Salt and Vinegar
Dill Pickle
Lightly Salted
Roast Chicken
Cheddar and Sour Cream
Old Fashioned Bar•B•Q
Cheddar Jalapeño 
Cheese and Onion (Limited)
Spicy Cheddar Limited
Flavours from India
Magic Masala
Cream & Onion
Flavours from China
Cucumber
Chicken and Tomato
Wavy
Cheddar & Sour Cream
Hickory Bar•B•Q
Lightly Salted
Original
Salt and Vinegar
Sour Cream and Sriracha
Stax
Original
Cheedar
Bar•B•Q
Salt and Vinegar
Sour Cream and Onion
Doritos
Nacho Cheese
Flaming Hot Nacho Cheese (Limited)
Cool Ranch
Jalapeño Cheddar
Intense Pickle
Zesty Cheese
Bold BBQ
Sweet Chili Heat
Roulette
Collisions: Habanero and Guacamole 
Ketchup (Limited)
Guacamole (Limited)
Sonic Sour Cream (Limited, new 2017)
Ruffles
Regular
Sour Cream and Onion
All Dressed
Bar•B•Q
Flaming Hot BBQ (Spring 2019)
Sour Cream and Bacon
Loaded Potato Skins
Chili Cheese
Mozzarella and Marinara
Sweet & Spicy
Salt and Vinegar
Original Double Crunch
Ketchup Double Crunch
Japaleño Cheddar Double Crunch
Cheetos
Puffs
Crunchy
Crunchy Jalapeño 
Crunchy Flamin’ Hot Sweet Chilli 
Crunchy Flamin' Hot
Ketchup Leaves
Sun Chips
French Onion
Harvest Cheddar
Garden Salsa
Miss Vickie's
Original
Sea Salt and Malt Vinegar
Jalapeño
Sweet Chili and Sour Cream
Lime and Black Pepper
Applewood Smoke BBQ
Harvest Cheddar and Herbs
Sweet Southern BBQ
Honey Dijon (Spring 2019)
Spicy Dill Pickle
Sweet and Spicy Ketchup
Kurkure
Masala Munch
Chilli Chatka
Hostess
Hickory Sticks
Smartfood
Standard Popcorn
Movie Night Butter
White Cheddar
Asiago and Black Pepper
Jalapeno and Cheddar
Gouda and Chive
Sour Cream and Onion
Sweet and Salty
Indulgence: Milk Chocolate & Caramel Drizzle
Indulgence: Dark Chocolate & Raspberry Drizzle
Delight
White Cheddar
Sea Salt
Salted Caramel

Discontinued

Hostess
Regular
Sour Cream and Onion
Ketchup
Genuine Barbecue
Salt and Vinegar
Dill Pickle
Doritos
Texas Tang
Late Night Cheeseburger 
Loaded Nacho

See also
Frito-Lay

References

External links
Frito-Lay Canada 

Canadian snack foods
Companies based in Cambridge, Ontario
Food and drink companies established in 1935
1935 establishments in Ontario
Canadian companies established in 1935
Canadian subsidiaries of foreign companies